Kunugia is a genus of moths in the family Lasiocampidae described by Kikujiro Nagano in 1917.

Selected species
Kunugia ampla (Walker, 1855)
Kunugia austroplacida Holloway, 1987
Kunugia basinigra (Roepke, 1953)
Kunugia brunnea (Wileman, 1915)
Kunugia burmensis Gaede, 1932
Kunugia celebica Zolotuhin & J.D. Holloway, 2006
Kunugia dendrolimoides Zolotuhin, Treadaway & Witt, 1998
Kunugia divaricata (Moore, 1884)
Kunugia dora C. Swinhoe, 1893
Kunugia drakei Holloway, 1987
Kunugia fae Zolotuhin, Treadaway & Witt, 1998
Kunugia falco Zolotuhin, 2002
Kunugia ferox Holloway, 1987
Kunugia florimaculata (Tsai & Hou, 1983)
Kunugia fulgens Moore, 1879
Kunugia grjukovae Zolotuhin, 2005
Kunugia gynandra (C. Swinhoe, 1893)
Kunugia hollowayi Zolotuhin, Treadaway & Witt, 1998
Kunugia imeldae Zolotuhin, Treadaway & Witt, 1998
Kunugia labahingra Zolotuhin & S. Ihle, 2008
Kunugia latipennis (Walker, 1855)
Kunugia lemeepauli (Lemée & Tams, 1950)
Kunugia lineata (Moore, 1879)
Kunugia magellani (De Lajonquière, 1978)
Kunugia mediacolorata Zolotuhin & Witt, 2000
Kunugia mervillei Zolotuhin, Treadaway & Witt, 1998
Kunugia mervillei bulagaw Zolotuhin, Treadaway & Witt, 1998
Kunugia mervillei noeli Zolotuhin, Treadaway & Witt, 1998
Kunugia pippae Zolotuhin, Treadaway & Witt, 1998
Kunugia pippae tagubodica Zolotuhin, Treadaway & Witt, 1998
Kunugia placida (Moore, 1879)
Kunugia quadrilineata Holloway, 1987
Kunugia rectifascia (Holloway, 1976)
Kunugia siamka Zolotuhin, 2002
Kunugia sinjaevi Zolotuhin & Witt, 2000
Kunugia tamsi De Lajonquière, 1973
Kunugia undans Walker, 1855
Kunugia varuna Zolotuhin & J.D. Holloway, 2006
Kunugia victoriae S. Ihle, 2006
Kunugia vulpina Moore, 1879
Kunugia wotteni Zolotuhin, 2005
Kunugia xichangensis (Tsai & Liu, 1962)
Kunugia yamadai Nagano, 1917

References

External links

Lasiocampidae